The 1971 National Football League draft was held January 28–29, 1971, at the Belmont Plaza Hotel in New York City, New York.  The Boston Patriots, who did not officially change their name to New England Patriots until after the draft, used the first overall pick of the draft to select quarterback Jim Plunkett. It was the first draft where the first three selections were quarterbacks (Plunkett, Archie Manning, and Dan Pastorini).

During round 17, after Falcons coach Norm Van Brocklin had yelled to his staff "Do we want the roughest, toughest s.o.b. in the draft?!", the team drafted the then-64-year-old actor John Wayne, though saying he was from "Fort Apache State" (Wayne actually played football at USC); NFL Commissioner Pete Rozelle rejected the selection.

Player selections

Round one

Round two

Round three

Round four

Round five

Round six

Round seven

Round eight

Round nine

Round ten

Round eleven

Round twelve

Round thirteen

Round fourteen

Round fifteen

Round sixteen

Round seventeen

Notable undrafted players

Hall of Famers
 Jack Ham, linebacker from Pennsylvania State, taken 2nd round 34th overall by Pittsburgh Steelers
Inducted: Professional Football Hall of Fame class of 1988.
 John Riggins, running back from Kansas, taken 1st round 6th overall by New York Jets
Inducted: Professional Football Hall of Fame class of 1992.
 Dan Dierdorf, offensive tackle from Michigan, taken 2nd round 43rd overall by St. Louis Cardinals
Inducted: Professional Football Hall of Fame class of 1996.
 Jack Youngblood, defensive end from Florida, taken 1st round 20th overall by Los Angeles Rams
Inducted: Professional Football Hall of Fame class of 2001.
Harold Carmichael, wide receiver from Southern, taken 7th round 161st overall by Philadelphia Eagles
Inducted: Professional Football Hall of Fame class of 2020

References

External links
 NFL.com – 1971 Draft
 databaseFootball.com – 1971 Draft
 Pro Football Hall of Fame 

National Football League Draft
NFL Draft
Draft
NFL Draft
NFL Draft
American football in New York City
1970s in Manhattan
Sporting events in New York City
Sports in Manhattan